Charles Alfred Paul Marais de Beauchamp (3 March 1883 – 30 January 1977), 5th Baron Soye, was a French zoologist.

Life
Paul Marais de Beauchamp was born in 1883 in Paris as the first son of Etienne Arthur Marais de Beauchamp, office manager of the Ministry of Public Instruction and Fine Arts, and Elisabeth Nicard, granddaughter of Jean Louis Soye, 1st Baron Soye.

In 1950, he was president of the Zoological Society of France.

Work
Beauchamp specialized in the study of rotifers and turbellarians.

Selected works

Homages
The genus of freshwater planarians Debeauchampia (currently a synonym of Procerodes) and the genus of land planarians Beauchampius were named after him.

References

French zoologists
1883 births
1977 deaths
20th-century French zoologists